John Joseph O'Kelly (known as Sceilg; 7 July 1872 – 26 March 1957) was an Irish republican politician, author and publisher who served as President of Sinn Féin from 1926 to 1931, Minister for Education from 1921 to 1922, Minister for Irish from 1920 to 1921 and Leas-Cheann Comhairle of Dáil Éireann from 1919 to 1921. He served as a Teachta Dála from 1918 to 1921 and 1922 to 1923.

Early years
O'Kelly was born in Coramore, on Valentia Island off the County Kerry coast, he was the son of Patrick Kelly, a farmer, and Ellen Sullivan. While his birth date is recorded as 7 July 1872, his family gave it as 4 July.

Political career
He joined Sinn Féin at its inaugural meeting on 5 November 1905. Following the 1916 Easter Rising, O'Kelly joined the Irish Nation League and became treasurer of the Irish National Aid and Volunteers' Dependants' Fund for the relief of prisoners and their families. In February 1917, he was arrested and deported to England where he was interned without trial for several months. On his release O'Kelly was elected to the Provisional Committee of the newly merged Irish Nation League and Sinn Féin, thereafter called Sinn Féin. He was appointed editor of the influential "Catholic Bulletin". In the 1918 general election he was elected as a Sinn Féin MP for Louth by 255 votes in what was the closest contest in Ireland in that election. The closeness of the contest was due to the strong AOH organisation in the county that campaigned for outgoing North Galway MP Richard Hazleton of the Irish Parliamentary Party.

O'Kelly took his seat in Dáil Éireann as a Sinn Féin TD and was Leas-Cheann Comhairle (deputy chairperson) from 1919 to 1921. He was appointed Minister for Irish in the Government of the 2nd Dáil. This position that was expanded as the Minister for Education in the Government of the 2nd Dáil. From 1919 to 1923, he was President of the Gaelic League. He opposed the Anglo-Irish Treaty that was ratified by the Dáil in January 1922, and refused to accept the legitimacy of the Irish Free State established in December 1922. He and others maintained that the Irish Republic continued to exist and that the rump of the Second Dáil, composed of those anti-Treaty TDs who had refused to take their seats in what became the Free State parliament, was the only legitimate government for the whole of Ireland. In June 1922, he was elected to the Third Dáil for the constituency of Louth-Meath but abstained from taking his seat. In August 1923, standing as a Republican for the Meath constituency, he was defeated for an abstentionist seat in the 4th Dáil. He was again defeated in the Roscommon by-election of 1925, his last election attempt. After the resignation of Éamon de Valera as president of Sinn Féin in 1926, O'Kelly, who maintained an abstentionist policy towards Dáil Éireann, was elected in his place and remained in this position until 1931 when Brian O'Higgins took over the leadership.

O'Kelly was hostile towards the 1937 Constitution of Ireland, claiming it was insufficiently supportive of Irish Republicanism and that the Constitution also did not require the President of Ireland to be of Irish birth.

Sceilg was unusual among Irish Republicans in that he regarded Daniel O'Connell and T.M. Healy as political heroes. This apparently reflected local patriotism (both men came from south-western Ireland near to Sceilg's own birthplace) and Sceilg's own devout Catholicism, which led him to exalt O'Connell's achievement of Catholic Emancipation and Healy's claims that the adultery of Charles Stewart Parnell with Katharine O'Shea made Parnell unfit for political leadership. Sceilg was also explicitly hostile to the Spanish Republic declared in 1931, believing it to be anti-Catholic and supported by pro-British Freemasons.

Literary interests
He was a prolific author on Irish language and history topics, editing Banba, The Catholic Bulletin and An Camán. He was intensely religious and an active Catholic.  O'Kelly opposed members of the IRA fighting against Franco in the Spanish Civil War. In 1938, he was one of seven remaining abstentionist Second Dáil TDs who transferred what they believed was their authority as the Government of the Irish Republic to the IRA Army Council (see Irish republican legitimatism).

In 1938, he visited Germany, later publishing his impressions in the Irish Independent.

Anti-Semitism
Many of O'Kelly's speeches and writings contained content critical of Freemasons and Jews. In 1916, members of Ireland's Jewish community protested after the Catholic Bulletin published a series of articles by Fr. T.H. Burbage accusing the Jewish community of carrying out ritual murders; O'Kelly refused to apologise for the articles. O'Kelly also featured the anti-semitic writings of Denis Fahey in the Bulletin. 

In 1930, O'Kelly, speaking as Sinn Féin President to its members, said, "In the signs of the Anti-Christ, England is today the prey of rival groups of unscrupulous Jews fighting for their lands."

In 1939 O'Kelly spoke at Cork City Hall and praised Nazi Germany's treatment of Jews, saying: "England's difficulty is Ireland's opportunity...its seems to me that England prefers to plant the Jews in Ireland, as she planted the Cromwellians, The Orangemen...How many people in Ireland reflect that the Treaty of Versailles placed Germany...with the heel of Jews on her neck...while Jewish usury emaciated and the Jewish White Slave Trade sought to corrupt the whole land".

Death
O'Kelly died in Our Lady's Hospice, Harold's Cross, on 26 March 1957, and was buried in Glasnevin Cemetery on 28 March.

Bibliography
 Cathal Brugha, 1942
 Taistealuidheacht, nó Cúrsa na Cruinne ("Travelling, or A World Tour"), 1931
 Spelling Made Easy, 1946
 A Trinity of Martyrs (biographies of Terence McSwiney, Cathal Brugha and Austin Stack), 1947
 Ireland's Spiritual Empire: Saint Patrick as a World Figure, 1952

References

Further reading
Dr. Brian P. Murphy, The Catholic Bulletin and Republican Ireland 1898–1926: with special reference to J. J. O'Kelly (Athol Books: Belfast, 2005)
"County Louth: the Irish political revolution and the 1918 general election" by Oisín S. Kelly (MA thesis, 2006, UCD)

External links

 

 

1872 births
1957 deaths
Antisemitism in Ireland
Early Sinn Féin TDs
Irish nationalists
Irish republicans
Leaders of Sinn Féin
Members of the 1st Dáil
Members of the 2nd Dáil
Members of the 3rd Dáil
Members of the Parliament of the United Kingdom for County Louth constituencies (1801–1922)
Ministers for Education (Ireland)
Politicians from County Kerry
UK MPs 1918–1922